Linda Darnell Cooper-Suggs (born 1953) is an American politician. She is a former Democratic member of the North Carolina House of Representatives. She has represented the 24th district (composed of all of Wilson County) from 2020 to 2023.

Career
Cooper-Suggs was selected by Democratic party activists from Wilson County on July 25, 2020 to represent the 24th House district, a vacancy left by the resignation of Jean Farmer-Butterfield. Her appointment was approved by North Carolina governor Roy Cooper on July 27, 2020. She ran for the same office in November 2020 and won the election on 3 November 2020 from the platform of Democratic Party. She secured fifty-three percent of the vote while her closest rival Republican Mick Rankin secured forty-seven percent.

Electoral history

2022

2020

Committee assignments

2021-2022 session
Appropriations 
Appropriations - Health and Human Services 
Families, Children, and Aging Policy 
Health 
Redistricting

References

Living people
1953 births
People from Wilson, North Carolina
North Carolina A&T State University alumni
East Carolina University alumni
Democratic Party members of the North Carolina House of Representatives
21st-century American politicians
21st-century African-American politicians
21st-century American women politicians
Women state legislators in North Carolina